Hiroshi Ishii may refer to:

 Hiroshi Ishii (computer scientist), Japanese computer scientist
 Hiroshi Ishii (swimmer) (born 1939), Japanese swimmer and Olympic medalist
 Hiroshi Ishii (golfer) (1941–2006), Japanese professional golfer